Liliya Kulyk (born 27 January 1987) is a Ukrainian triple jumper.

She won the bronze medal at the 2006 World Junior Championships. This was the first time she broke the 14-metre barrier, with a 14.01 jump. She improved further to 14.39 metres when she won the 2007 European U23 Championships. At the 2009 European U23 Championships she took the bronze medal. She also competed at the 2008 Olympic Games, the 2009 World Championships and the 2010 World Indoor Championships without reaching the final.

Her personal best jump is still 14.39 metres, achieved in July 2007 in Debrecen.

References

1987 births
Living people
Ukrainian female triple jumpers
Athletes (track and field) at the 2008 Summer Olympics
Olympic athletes of Ukraine